The discography of Swedish singer Tove Styrke consists of four studio albums, two extended plays (EPs), thirty singles (including five as a featured artist), and twenty music videos. At the age of sixteen, Styrke finished in third place on the sixth season of Idol in December 2009. She was signed then to Sony Music and released her debut single "Million Pieces" in June 2010. Her debut studio album Tove Styrke (2010) received positive critical response for its electropop sound. The album earned a gold certification by the Swedish Recording Industry Association (GLF). The single "White Light Moment" was a commercial success on charts and radio in Sweden, peaking at number five on the Sverigetopplistan singles chart. The album was distributed abroad in the next two years with the single "Call My Name", which entered charts in Belgium and Germany.

In 2012, Styrke canceled a summer tour to take a break from music due to a burnout. In 2014, she returned with the EP Borderline and released her second studio album Kiddo the following year. The album was positively received by critics, who coined it as "feminist pop". Its second single, "Borderline", missed the charts, but received a gold certification in Sweden. Styrke collaborated with producer Elof Loelv for her third studio album Sway (2018), for which the singer aimed to create songs with minimal production. The lead single, "Say My Name", received critical acclaim and was named the 91st-best-song of the 2010s decade by Rolling Stone. The album's second single, "Mistakes", was a top-fifty hit in Sweden, where it was certified gold.

In 2020, Styrke participated on the music reality television series Så mycket bättre. Her cover version of Lili & Susie's song "Bara du och jag" peaked at number 30 on the Swedish singles chart and was certified gold. The following year, she released the singles "Mood Swings" and "Start Walking". Her fourth studio album Hard, which was preceded by the singles "Show Me Love" and "Hardcore", was released in June 2022.

Studio albums

Extended plays

Singles

As lead artist

As featured artist

Promotional singles

Other charted songs

Guest appearances

Music videos

Notes

References

External links
 [ Tove Styrke] discography at AllMusic
 
 

Discography
Discographies of Swedish artists
Pop music discographies